Simmondsiaceae or the jojoba family is a family of flowering plants.  The family is not recognized by all taxonomic systems, the single species, Simmondsia chinensis, often being treated as belonging to family Buxaceae.

The APG II system, of 2003 (unchanged from the APG system, of 1998), does recognize this family and assigns it to the order Caryophyllales in the clade core eudicots.  It consist of a single species only,  jojoba (Simmondsia chinensis), of North American shrubs.

The Cronquist system, 1981, had also recognized this family and placed it in order Euphorbiales.

References

External links
 Euphorbiales : an overview of the history

Caryophyllales
Caryophyllales families
Monogeneric plant families